Dry Grove Township is located in McLean County, Illinois. As of the 2010 census, its population was 1,572 and it contained 618 housing units.

Dry Grove Township took its name after Dry Grove, an area of forest at a relatively high and dry elevation.

Geography

Demographics

References

External links
City-data.com
Illinois State Archives

Townships in McLean County, Illinois
Townships in Illinois